These are the official results of the Men's Hammer Throw event at the 1991 World Championships in Tokyo, Japan. There were a total number of 27 participating athletes, with the final held on Sunday August 25, 1991. The qualification mark was set at 75.50 metres.

Medalists

Schedule
All times are Japan Standard Time (UTC+9)

Abbreviations
All results shown are in metres

Records

Qualification

Group A

Group B

Final

See also
 1988 Men's Olympic Hammer Throw (Seoul)
 1990 Men's European Championships Hammer Throw (Split)
 1991 Hammer Throw Year Ranking
 1992 Men's Olympic Hammer Throw (Barcelona)

References
 Results
 hammerthrow.wz

H
Hammer throw at the World Athletics Championships